The Matero Magic are a Zambian semi-professional basketball club from the Matero neighbourhood of Lusaka. The team plays in the Zambia Basketball League and has won the championship a record 10 times. The Magic features many players who are also part of the Zambia national team.

Honours
Zambia Basketball League
Champions (10): ?, ?, ?, ?, 2004, 2013, 2015, 2016, 2020, 2022

Players

Current roster

Head coaches
 Liz Mills (2015–2016)
 Oberty Shamboko
 Emmanuel Moses Jean-Pierre (2021–present)

References

External links
Matero Magic at Afrobasket.com

Basketball teams in Zambia
Sport in Lusaka
Road to BAL teams